Eetu is a male given name. It may refer to:

 Sulo Eetu Jussila (1882-1973), Finnish politician and farmer
 Eetu Karvinen (born 1993), Finnish ice hockey player
 Eetu Koski (born 1992), Finnish ice hockey player
 Eetu Luostarinen (born 1998), Finnish ice hockey player
 Eetu Muinonen (born 1986), Finnish footballer
 Eetu Pöysti (born 1989), Finnish ice hockey player
 Eetu Qvist (born 1983), Finnish ice hockey player
 Johan Edvard Eetu Salin (1866–Helsinki), Finnish shoemaker, journalist and politician
 Eetu Sopanen (born 1996), Finnish ice hockey player
 Eetu Tuulola (born 1998), Finnish ice hockey player
 Eetu Uusitalo, former member of the Finnish alternative rock/metal band Sara
 Eetu Vähäsöyrinki (born 1990), Finnish Nordic combined skier
 nickname of Edvard Westerlund (1901-1982), Finnish Greco-Roman wrestler, 1924 Olympic champion

Finnish masculine given names